is a passenger railway station located in the city of Ōzu, Ehime Prefecture, Japan. It is operated by JR Shikoku and has the station number "S13".

Lines
Only local trains stop at the station. Connections with other services are needed to travel further east of Matsuyama on the line.

Layout
The station, which is unstaffed, consists of a side platform serving a single track. There is no station building, only a shelter on the platform for waiting passengers. A flight of steps leads up to the platform from the access road. A bike shed is provided nearby.

History
At that time, it was an intermediate station on the privately run 762 mm gauge Ehime Railway between Ōzu (now  and Nagahama-machi (now . When the company was nationalized on 1 October 1933, Japanese Government Railways (JGR) assumed control and operated the station as part of the Ehime Line. On 1 April 1950, Jyoromatsu was renamed Iyo-Izushi. With the privatization of JNR on 1 April 1987, the station came under the control of JR Shikoku.

Surrounding area
Hijikawa - Yamato Bridge
Ozu Municipal Yamato Elementary Scho

See also
 List of railway stations in Japan

References

External links
Station timetable

Railway stations in Ehime Prefecture
Railway stations in Japan opened in 1918
Ōzu, Ehime